Blackmail is a 1947 American film noir crime film directed by Lesley Selander and starring William Marshall, Adele Mara and Ricardo Cortez. The lead character is based on a pulp magazine hero Dan Turner, Hollywood Detective.

Premise
A shamus is approached by an entertainment executive to stop a blackmail plot against him.

Cast
 William Marshall as Dan Turner
 Adele Mara as Sylvia Duane
 Ricardo Cortez as Ziggy Cranston
 Grant Withers as Police Inspector Donaldson
 Stephanie Bachelor as Carla
 Richard Fraser as Antoine le Blanc
 Roy Barcroft as Spice Kellaway
 George J. Lewis as Blue Chip Winslow
 Gregory Gaye as Jervis
 Tristram Coffin as Pinky
 Eva Novak as Mamie, the Maid
 Bud Wolfe as Gomez

Reception
When released The New York Times critic gave the film a mixed review, writing, "Evidently the writers and/or Republic, the manufacturer, were convinced that some fast dialogue would enhance the rather confused goings on. But this yarn about a California playboy who becomes involved with shakedown artists and is aided by a brash, private investigator needed more than an occasional bright quip to keep things clear and moving."

References

External links
 
 
 

1947 films
1940s crime thriller films
American black-and-white films
American crime drama films
1940s English-language films
Film noir
Films directed by Lesley Selander
Republic Pictures films
American crime thriller films
1940s American films